Labone Senior High School (popularly known as L-A Bone) is a public senior high school located in Labone in the Greater Accra Region of Ghana. It is well noted for its participation in National Science and Maths Quiz, athletics, music and cultural activities.

Brief history 
In 1949, six leaders of Ghana saw the need to establish an educational institution to cater for the educational needs of the young people staying around Osu and La and its environs. A private school was therefore established at Ako Adjei Area.

At independence, the first president of Ghana, Kwame Nkrumah, realized that to achieve his ideals with respect to the rapid development of the country, educational facilities should be widespread and brought to the doorstep of each Ghanaian child.

The Ghana Educational Trust was therefore instituted during the 1st republic and was charged with the construction of school buildings throughout the country, including Labone. The school was then relocated at the present site (opposite the Labone S.D.A Church).And well famous school in Ghana.By Ameyaw Solomon Chancellor

The crest of Labone senior high school - composition, meaning and symbolism 
The crest was designed by Nii Amon Kotei a senior citizen and national award winner who also designed the Ghana coat of arms.

The crest of the school is a shield divided into four quarters with strong fishing rope running horizontally and vertically.

Each of the four quarters carries an appropriate motive

 Top right-hand corner: The early appearance of the SUN in the East: This depicts "Make hay while the sun shines"
 Top left-hand quarter: A crossed pen and torch light on an open book: this depicts "the pen is mightier than the sword"
 The bottom left-hand quarter: A crossed pick axe and cutlass: This depicts "Dignity in labour"
 The bottom left hand quarter: The oil palm tree is a wonder plant which symbolizes usefulness and productivity (Labone Senior High School students should therefore be productive and useful in all aspects of life, wherever they find themselves) [3].

Courses offered 
The school offers: 
 Business
 Home economics
 Visual arts
 Science
 General arts
 Music

Facilities 
The school has facilities such as:
 Science Lab
 Computer lab
 Library
 Home economics unit
 Football Field
 Volleyball basketball courts
 Baseball field
 Visual arts unit
 Music Lab
 Naval cadet
 Physical education unit

Chronology of heads of Labone senior high school 
(SINCE IT BECAME A GOVERNMENT ASSISTED SCHOOL)

 Rev (Dr.) S. Gyasi Nimako...................1955 - 1961
 Mr. R. Lomo Jones...............................1961 - 196
 Mr. E. A Lamptey.................................1968 - 1982
 Mr. Bossman Owusu - Ayim..............1982 - 1990
 Mr. D. H. K. Ofosu...............................1990
 Mr. Peter Owusu  - Donkor...............1990 - 1995
 Mrs Cecilia Aggrey - Mensah.............1995 - 2003
 Mrs. Joyce Ossei - Agyekum...............2003 - 2013
 Mrs. Mary Amankwah........................2013 - 2014
 Ms. Kate Bannerman.........................2014 - 2017
 Mrs. Cynthia Obuo Nti.......................2017 - present

References

High schools in Ghana